Jose Charles Pereira Barbosa (born 10 December 1997), commonly known as Charles Barbosa, is a Brazilian footballer who currently plays as a forward for Retrô.

Career statistics

Club

Notes

References

1997 births
Living people
Brazilian footballers
Association football forwards
Belo Jardim Futebol Clube players
Retrô Futebol Clube Brasil players
Vera Cruz Futebol Clube players